Harry William Baals (November 16, 1886 – May 9, 1954) was an American politician who was the Republican mayor of Fort Wayne, Indiana, from 1934 to 1947, and from 1951 until his death in 1954.

Biography
When Baals first took office, he consolidated city departments and lowered city tax rates. He launched construction of Fort Wayne's massive underground sewage system and had the city sewage treatment plant built, which is still being used today.

During the Great Depression, Mayor Baals directed war materials drives, upgraded city equipment and services, and broke ground for Baer Field, now Fort Wayne International Airport. In the 1930s, one of his major accomplishments was getting the old Nickel Plate Railroad tracks, running through downtown, to be elevated. This opened up the north side of the city for development.

Fort Wayne newscaster Bob Chase, of WOWO-AM, related a story that he once pronounced the mayor's name . Mayor Baals personally called him following the broadcast to correct his pronunciation, saying, "son, this is your Mayor. I pronounce my name ."

Personal life and death
He had two children: Marceil D. Baals Smith and Donald Baals.

Harry W. Baals died in 1954 of a kidney infection, while serving his fourth term as mayor. He is buried at Lindenwood Cemetery in Fort Wayne, Indiana.

Legacy

Harry Baals Drive was named in honor of the late mayor, extending east from Parnell Avenue, north and west of the St. Joseph River in Johnny Appleseed Park. In recent years, the double entendre arising from Baals's name has led Fort Wayne officials to shy away from naming streets and buildings after him. The aforementioned street has been renamed to "H. W. Baals Drive" due to persistent theft of the street sign.

Harry Baals Government Center
In early 2011 Fort Wayne city officials invited people to suggest names for a new government building. The winner with 23,826 votes was the "Harry Baals Government Center," more than ten times the votes received by the closest contender.  But city officials  almost immediately backed away from the name (many Americans, including those in the Fort Wayne area, pronounce Harry identically to hairy due to the Mary–marry–merry merger.)  The city's deputy mayor Beth Malloy said, "We realize that while Harry Baals was a respected mayor, not everyone outside of Fort Wayne will know that. We wanted to pick something that would reflect our pride in our community beyond the boundaries of Fort Wayne."  Subsequently, it was announced that the building would be named "Citizens Square."

Baals's descendants have taken to pronouncing their name .

References
Citations

Bibliography
 "Baals, Harry William" (biographical sketch, p. 747), Who's Who and What's What in Indiana Politics, published by James E. Perry, Indianapolis, 1944.

External links

 Killer in the Rain
 

Mayors of Fort Wayne, Indiana
Indiana Republicans
1886 births
1954 deaths
20th-century American politicians
People from Fort Wayne, Indiana